The 2012–13 W-League season was the fifth season of the W-League, the Australian national women's football (soccer) competition. The season consisted of twelve matchdays followed by a finals series.

This season saw the addition of a new team, the Western Sydney Wanderers, to the W-League (paralleling the club also fielding new teams in the A-League and Youth League) bringing the competition back up to eight teams.  This means each matchday involved all eight teams, resulting in the regular season increasing from ten games to twelve for each team.

Clubs
Season announcement
W-League teams for the 2012–13 season:

Personnel and kits

Foreign players

The following do not fill a Visa position:
AAustralian citizens who have chosen to represent another national team;
BThose players who were born and started their professional career abroad but have since gained Australian citizenship;

Regular season

League table

Matches

Round 1

Round 2

Round 3

Round 4

Round 5

Round 6

Round 7

Round 8

Round 9

Round 10

Round 11

Round 12

Finals series

Semi-finals

Grand final

Season statistics

Leading goalscorers

International competition
The winners of the 2011–12 season Canberra United participated in the 2012 International Women's Club Championship, known as the Mobcast Cup for sponsorship reasons, the first edition of this tournament hosted by the JFA.

Canberra United finished in fourth place (out of four teams), suffering two losses.

See also

 2012–13 Adelaide United W-League season
 2012–13 Western Sydney Wanderers W-League season

References

 
Aus
1
2012–13